Tibetan Uprising may refer to:

 The 1959 Tibetan uprising
 The 2008 Tibetan unrest
 Tibetan Uprising Day, observed on March 10.